Dragon Ball Z: The History of Trunks, known in Japan as  is a TV special anime based on Akira Toriyama's Dragon Ball manga series. Originally airing in Japan on February 24, 1993, between episodes 175 and 176, the special is based on an extra chapter of the manga series. It depicts the original post-apocalyptic future in which Goku dies from the heart virus and a teenage Trunks tries to defeat Androids 17 and 18 (native name:人造人間), humanoid robots who were originally designed to murder Goku and his allies, before their immense destructive power destroys the Earth completely.

Plot
In an alternate timeline, two years after defeating Frieza and King Cold, Goku succumbs to a viral heart disease. Goku's death, being the result of natural causes, means that he can no longer be revived with the Dragon Balls. Six months later, Piccolo, Vegeta, Krillin, Tien Shinhan, Yamcha, and Chiaotzu are killed by Android 17 and Android 18. With the death of Piccolo, Earth's guardian, Kami, dies as well and the Dragon Balls are rendered permanently useless - making it impossible for anyone to be revived.

Thirteen years later, the androids terrorize the planet while the sole survivor of the battle, Gohan, unsuccessfully attempts to stop them. He agrees to train Trunks, the teenage son of Vegeta and Bulma, who is eager to help. Gohan attempts to provoke Trunks enough to trigger his transformation into a Super Saiyan so that they will stand a better chance, but all are unsuccessful. The androids attack an amusement park and Gohan challenges them once again. However, Gohan is overwhelmed and Trunks intervenes. Android 18 easily defeats Trunks requiring Gohan to protect him. As Gohan hides with his unconscious pupil in his arms, the androids, unable to find their targets, bombard the entire area with energy blasts and leave. The pair are nearly killed and Gohan gives Trunks his final healing Senzu bean in order to save his life. Trunks awakens to find that Gohan has lost his left arm and brings him home to Bulma who saves his life. Once healed, Gohan resumes Trunks' training.

One day, a huge explosion erupts within a nearby city. Gohan seemingly allows Trunks to join him, but renders him unconscious and departs alone. Gohan fights the androids but he is eventually overwhelmed and killed. Alerted by Gohan's energy signal suddenly vanishing, Trunks awakens and hurries into the city, where he finds Gohan's corpse. In his anger and grief, Trunks finally awakens his Super Saiyan transformation.

Three years pass and Trunks assists Bulma with building a time machine, when a warning on the television indicates that the androids are attacking a nearby city. Despite Bulma's warnings, Trunks confronts them but is easily defeated and nearly killed. He awakens in his house with his mother at his side, and finally decides that the time machine is their best hope to find a way to stop the androids. Once healed, Trunks prepares to depart with medicine to cure Goku's heart disease in hand. He travels twenty years into the past with the hopes of changing his future.

Cast

Notes
Goku is listed in the credits of this special, despite not having any lines.

Music

Funimation Soundtrack
The following songs were present in the English version of Dragon Ball Z: The History of Trunks, as well as its accompanying soundtrack CD, with exception to most of Dream Theater's music, "Home" being the only track showcased in the soundtrack from them and "Prelude" by Slaughter.  The soundtrack also contained remixes of other songs.

 Bootsy Collins with Buckethead - Shackler
 Neck Down - Garden of Grace
 Triprocket - Immigrant Song
 Dream Theater - Regression
 Dream Theater - Overture 1928
 Dream Theater - Fatal Tragedy
 Dream Theater - Through Her Eyes
 Dream Theater - Home
 Dream Theater - The Dance of Eternity
 Dream Theater - Beyond This Life
 Slaughter -  Prelude
 Slaughter - Unknown Destination

However, the TV special on Double Feature, there is an alternate audio track containing the English dub with original Japanese background music by Shunsuke Kikuchi.

Reception
Anime News Network's reviewer Chris Shepard stated: "It is interesting... Gohan and Trunks are both understandable characters who I was really able to get into and sympathize for during their battles" but also felt a "good understanding of the happenings of the TV series is recommended". He also felt that the action sequences were exceptional and did not "overdo themselves". He expressed some disappointment in the English dub as the storyline sounded "completely alien" to the Japanese subtitles. For his final grade he noted "[the] Dub doesn't contain the original music... [it] isn't true to the original" but was pleased overall.

John Sinnott of DVDTalk praised the television special, seeing it as being separate from the other episodes of Dragon Ball. He believed this to be a positive attribute. Regarding the Blu-ray release of the film he was less impressed with the color and aspect ratio, citing them as not particularly "exciting". However he expressed joy at Funimation leaving the original Japanese soundtrack and the English voice dubs in, describing them as "enveloping". For fans of Dragon Ball he recommended watching the episode as it "worked a lot better than the average theatrical film since they follow DBZ continuity and expand the story while filling in details". Like Shepard the Sinnott review advised those who are not familiar to the Dragon Ball franchise to avoid the episode but that fans will enjoy it. In conclusion he felt the film was enjoyable at best.

Releases
It was released on DVD and VHS in North America on October 24, 2000. Later a double feature was released with a second special and Bardock – The Father of Goku with digitally remastered widescreen format on DVD on February 19, 2008, then on Blu-ray released on July 15, 2008. The second special was re-released to DVD on September 15, 2009, in a remastered-widescreen single-disc edition.

References

External links

 

1993 films
1993 anime films
1993 television films
1993 television specials
Alternate history television episodes
Anime spin-offs
History of Trunks, The
Funimation
Television episodes about time travel
Films directed by Yoshihiro Ueda
Japanese animated films
Japanese television specials
1990s animated television specials
Films scored by Shunsuke Kikuchi